Norman John Schlueter (September 25, 1916 – October 6, 2004) was a Major League Baseball catcher who played for three seasons. He played for the Chicago White Sox from 1938 to 1939 and the Cleveland Indians in 1944.

External links

1916 births
2004 deaths
Major League Baseball catchers
Chicago White Sox players
Cleveland Indians players
Baseball players from Illinois